Rayleen is a given name. Notable people with the name include:

 Rayleen Lynch (born  1946), Australian basketball player

See also
 Raylee